An objective structured clinical examination (OSCE) is an approach to the assessment of clinical competence in which the components are assessed in a planned or structured way with attention being paid to the objectivity of the examination which is basically an organization framework consisting of multiple stations around which students rotate and at which students perform and are assessed on specific tasks. OSCE is a modern type of examination often used for assessment in health care disciplines.

History and Purpose 
The development of OSCE is credited to Prof. Ronald Harden. Since the publication of the first paper in the British Medical Journal in 1975, OSCE has been widely adopted in many medical schools and professional bodies. The format of OSCE is continuously evolving and may include real or simulated patients, clinical specimens, and other clinical  materials. OSCE is primarily used to assess focused clinical skills such as history taking, physical examination, diagnosis, communication, and counseling.  

In the last three decades the OSCE has seen a steady exponential growth and usage in both undergraduate and postgraduate examinations around the globe. The OSCE is also used for licensure examinations and as a feedback tool in formative settings. Common uses of the OSCE are listed below.  

 As a performance based assessment tool for testing the minimum accepted standards of students or trainees as barrier (exit) examinations during the undergraduate years in most of the medical schools.
 As a postgraduate high stakes assessment tool in Royal College examinations.
 As a formative assessment tool in undergraduate medical education.
 As a tool for the assessment of graduates seeking highstakes licensure and certification to practise medicine.
 As an educational tool to provide immediate feedback.
Objective structured clinical examinations evaluate learners “showing how” to perform complex clinical tasks including those infrequently observed and those core to practice.

Design
An OSCE usually comprises a circuit of short (the usual is 5–10 minutes although some use up to 15 minute) stations, in which each candidate is examined on a one-to-one basis with one or two impartial examiner(s) and either real or simulated (actors or electronic patient simulators) patients. Each station has a different examiner, as opposed to the traditional method of clinical examinations where a candidate would be assigned to an examiner for the entire examination. Candidates rotate through the stations, completing all the stations on their circuit. In this way, all candidates take the same stations. It is considered to be an improvement over traditional examination methods because the stations can be standardised enabling fairer peer comparison and complex procedures can be assessed without endangering patients health.

As the name suggests, an OSCE is designed to be objective – all candidates are assessed using exactly the same stations (although if real patients are used, their signs may vary slightly) with the same marking scheme. In an OSCE, candidates get marks for each step on the mark scheme that they perform correctly, which therefore makes the assessment of clinical skills more objective, rather than subjective, structured – stations in OSCEs have a very specific task. Where simulated patients are used, detailed scripts are provided to ensure that the information that they give is the same to all candidates, including the emotions that the patient should use during the consultation. Instructions are carefully written to ensure that the candidate is given a very specific task to complete. The OSCE is carefully structured to include parts from all elements of the curriculum as well as a wide range of skills. A clinical examination - the OSCE is designed to apply clinical and theoretical knowledge. Where theoretical knowledge is required, for example, answering questions from the examiner at the end of the station, then the questions are standardized and the candidate is only asked questions that are on the mark sheet and if the candidate is asked any others then there will be no marks for them.

Variation 
There are several variations of OSCE, those are:

 Objective Structured Practical Examination (OSPE), which assess practical skills, knowledge and/or interpretation of data in non clinical settings.
 Objective Structured Assessment of Technical Skills (OSATS), which designed for objective skills assessment, consisting of a global rating scale and a procedure specific checklist. It is primarily used for feedback or measuring progress of training in surgical specialities.
 Objective Structured Video Examinations (OSVE). The variation consists of videotaped recordings of patient-doctor encounters are shown to students simultaneously and questions related to the video clip are asked. Written answers are marked in a standardised manner.
 Team Objective Structured Clinical Examination (TOSCE). Formative assessment covering common consultations in general practice. A team of students visits each station in a group, performing one task each in a sequence. The candidates are marked for their performance and feedback is provided. The team approach improves efficiency and encourages learning from peers.

Advantages 
The advantages of OSCE are:

 Broader content coverage: Unlike the conventional short or long case examination format, multi-station OSCE allows broader content and domain coverage.
 Decreased bias: Student performance in each station is marked by independent examiners on a predetermined marking template that is customized to each patient scenario, thus reduces the variability of examination.
 Practicability: OSCE allows the use of simulated patients and clinical materials, thereby decreasing the need for real patients during the examination.

Disadvantages 
The disadvantages of OSCE are:

 Fragmentation of tasks: OSCE is often criticized for fragmenting a physician’s task as the candidates are asked to focus on a particular task, thus potentially undermines what a physician is expected to do in real life.
 Construct  invalidity: OSCE is based on a predefined list of activities that a candidate is required to perform during the examination. However, this may not be a true reflection of how a competent and experienced physician works in real life.
 Preparation time and budget: The preparation time for simulated patient (SP)-based OSCE is longer, as it includes script writing, training, and pilot testing. It may take several sessions for an SP to become familiar with the case and realistically portray the findings in a consistent manner. The increased budget needed to run a successful SP program is also a valid concern.

OSCE marking
Marking in OSCEs is done by the examiner. Occasionally written stations, for example, writing a prescription chart, are used and these are marked like written examinations, again usually using a standardized mark sheet. One of the ways an OSCE is made objective is by having a detailed mark scheme and standard set of questions. For example, a station concerning the demonstration to a simulated patient on how to use a metered dose inhaler [MDI] would award points for specific actions which are performed safely and accurately. The examiner can often vary the marks depending on how well the candidate performed the step. At the end of the mark sheet, the examiner often has a small number of marks that they can use to weight the station depending on performance and if a simulated patient is used, then they are often asked to add marks depending on the candidates approach. At the end, the examiner is often asked to give a "global score". This is usually used as a subjective score based on the candidates overall performance, not taking into account how many marks the candidate scored. The examiner is usually asked to rate the candidate as pass/borderline/fail or sometimes as excellent/good/pass/borderline/fail. This is then used to determine the individual pass mark for the station.

Many centres allocate each station an individual pass mark. The sum of the pass marks of all the stations determines the overall pass mark for the OSCE. Many centres also impose a minimum number of stations required to pass which ensures that a consistently poor performance is not compensated by a good performance on a small number of stations.

There are, however, criticisms that the OSCE stations can never be truly standardized and objective in the same way as a written exam. It has been known for different patients / actors to afford more assistance, and for different marking criteria to be applied. Finally, it is not uncommon at certain institutions for members of teaching staff be known to students (and vice versa) as the examiner. This familiarity does not necessarily affect the integrity of the examination process, although there is a deviation from anonymous marking. However, in OSCEs that use several circuits of the same stations the marking is repeatedly shown to be very consistent which supports the validity that the OSCE is a fair clinical examination. There are arguments for and against quarantining OSCE examinees to prevent sharing of exam information. Although the data tend to show no improvement in the overall scores in a later OSCE session, the research methodology is flawed and validity of the claim is questionable. A study suggested that marks do not give a sound inference of student collusion in an OSCE.

Candidates Preparation
Preparing for OSCEs is very different from preparing for an examination on  theory. In an OSCE, clinical skills are tested rather than pure theoretical knowledge. It is essential to learn correct clinical methods, and then practice repeatedly until one perfects the methods whilst simultaneously developing an understanding of the underlying theory behind the methods used. Marks are awarded for each step in the method; hence, it is essential to dissect the method into its individual steps, learn the steps, and then learn to perform the steps in a sequence.

Most hospitals and universities have clinical skills labs where students have the opportunity to practice clinical skills such as taking blood or mobilizing patients in a safe and controlled environment. It is often very helpful to practise in small groups with colleagues, setting a typical OSCE scenario and timing it with one person role playing a patient, one person doing the task and if possible, one person either observing and commenting on technique or even role playing the examiner using a sample mark sheet. Many OSCE textbooks have sample OSCE stations and mark sheets that can be helpful when studying in the manner. In doing this the candidate is able to get a feel of running to time and working under pressure.

In many OSCEs the stations are extended using data interpretation. For example, the candidate may have to take a brief history of chest pain and then interpret an electrocardiogram. It is also common to be asked for a differential diagnosis, to suggest which medical investigations the candidate would like to do or to suggest a management plan for the patient.

The peer-assisted mock OSCE improved tutee confidence, reduced the anxieties associated with OSCEs, and improved candidate confidence for OSCE.

See also
Health assessment
Multiple mini-interview

References

External links
OSCE FAQ from the Medical Council of Canada
OSCE information from the National Dental Examining Board of Canada

Standardized tests in healthcare education
Examinations